Ahn Jung-yeop (Hangul: 안정엽, born February 25, 1977), better known by the mononym Jungyup (Hangul: 정엽), is a South Korean singer and leader of Brown Eyed Soul, signed under in Next Music. He released his debut solo album, Thinkin` Back On Me on November 3, 2008.

Discography

Studio albums

Singles

Soundtrack appearances

Other charted songs

Filmography

Television show

References

1977 births
Living people
South Korean rhythm and blues singers
South Korean pop singers
21st-century South Korean  male singers